Maricourt is a commune in the Somme department in Hauts-de-France in northern France. It is twinned with Brundall, Norfolk, England.

Geography

Population

The Commonwealth Cemetery

See also
Communes of the Somme department

References

Communes of Somme (department)
World War I sites in France